Water monster may refer to:

 a sea monster
 a lake monster
 a water spirit
 a water bogey such as the grindylow, Jenny Greenteeth or Peg Powler
 an Axolotl, Mexican salamander

See also
 List of piscine and amphibian humanoids
 River monster (disambiguation)
 Sea Monsters (disambiguation)